The Collaborators is a 2015 independent British crime drama feature film directed by Andrew Smith and Dan Ollerhead. It was written by Svengali director John Hardwick.

Plot
Two art students are forced to take off across country in a stolen taxi to evade the law after they are caught up in a dangerous mix of sex, drugs and violence.

Production
Funding for the film was partially provided by University of Central Lancashire, as well support from Kickstarter backers. The Kickstarter campaign successfully reached its funding goal of £5000 on 5 March 2015.

The film was shot in and around Preston, Lancashire.

References

External links
 

British independent films
Films set in England
2015 independent films
British female buddy films
British crime drama films
2015 crime drama films
2010s female buddy films
Girls with guns films
2010s drama road movies
British drama road movies
2010s English-language films
2010s British films